Hao, or Haorangi, is a large coral atoll in the central part of the Tuamotu Archipelago. It was used to house the military support base for the nuclear tests on Mururoa. Because of its shape, French explorer Louis Antoine de Bougainville named it "Île de la Harpe" (Harp Island).

Geography
The lagoon is the fourth largest atoll in French Polynesia (after Rangiroa, Fakarava, and Makemo) and has only one navigable passage, at Kaki, on the north end of the atoll where strong currents prevail up to 20 knots with bores. The lagoon covers an area of 720 km2.

The climate is maritime, with temperatures oscillating between 23 and 32 °C throughout the year.

The chief town is the village of Otepa, where the main economic activity is the cultivation of pearls.

Demography
The main village is Otepa, and the population was 1066 inhabitants in the 2012 census, with a strong demographic increase since the establishment of the Pacific Experimentation Center (CEP) base for nuclear testing. However, in the last census conducted in 2017, a slight drop in the number of settlers is noted, reaching 1027 people.

Religion
Most of the population of the Atoll is a follower of Christianity as a result of the missionary activity of both Catholic and Protestant groups and French colonization. The Catholic Church began its activity in the region in the 19th century and has a religious building in the area called St. Peter's Church (Église de Saint-Pierre), located in Otepa, the largest town on the island and attached to the Metropolitan Archdiocese of Papeete with headquarters on the island of Tahiti.

History
The first recorded European arriving on Hao was Pedro Fernández de Quirós on 10 February 1606. He named it Conversion de San Pablo. He was followed by José Andía y Varela in 1774.

Because of its shape, French explorer Louis Antoine de Bougainville named it "Île de la Harpe" (Harp Island). In some maps it also appears as Bow Island.

Hao was the first atoll of the Tuamotus that Russian explorer Fabian Gottlieb von Bellingshausen visited in 1820 on the ships Vostok and Mirni.

In the late-1980s, two French intelligence (DGSE) operatives were briefly confined to the military base on the island after France obtained their release from a New Zealand prison for sinking the Greenpeace ship Rainbow Warrior. Their earlier-than-agreed-upon repatriation from the island by the French government became a diplomatic incident between New Zealand and France.

Hao's military airfield, now known as Hao Airport, was transferred to the civilian authorities in 2000. This airport  serves many of the smaller eastern Tuamotus, whose landing strips are too short to land aircraft large enough to make the flight to Tahiti.

The economic future of the atoll remains in question: the military base, which was the support base for nuclear testing on the nearby Mururoa atoll, was permanently shut down in 2002, along with its many support facilities, including the electrical and desalinization plants and the hospital. The livelihood of many of the atoll's inhabitants was directly tied to the military base.

Administration
Together with 11 other islands, Hao forms the commune of Hao, which is part of the administrative subdivision of Îles Tuamotu-Gambier. The seat of the commune is the village Otepa. The commune consists of three associated communes: Hao (including the uninhabited islands Ahunui, Nengonengo, Manuhangi and Paraoa), Amanu (including the uninhabited islands Rekareka and Tauere) and Hereheretue (including the uninhabited islands Anuanuraro and Anuanurunga and the inhabited island Nukutepipi). As of the 2017 census, the commune's total population was 1258.

Transport
Hao Airport  is in the island's north. It is used as a base by Air Tahiti, the domestic airline of French Polynesia.

Economy
During the 1960s, the Pacific Experimental Center base generated most of the atoll's economic activity. The infrastructures built during these years are numerous: a major airfield with a 3,380 m runway (classified by NASA as an emergency landing strip in case of a technical problem with the space shuttle Columbia), a cargo port, a 15 km road, desalination units, electric generators and a hospital.

Fishing, pearl farming and aquaculture 
Since 2000, the atoll's private sector activities have been mainly related to pearl farming, fishing (with the export to Tahiti of about ten tons of seafood per year) and copra harvesting.

On August 23, 2017, Chinese businessman Wang Cheng, chairman of Tahiti Nui Ocean Foods, announced in Papeete his intention to invest €1.3 billion ($1.5 billion) to create an aquaculture farm on Hao that could produce up to 50. 000 tons per year of lagoon fish (mainly groupers and humphead wrasse, but also sea cucumbers) for export. The French Polynesian government supports the project, which has been five years in the making, and which, according to its promoter, should allow the theoretical creation of nearly three hundred jobs during the thirty months of construction, and five hundred jobs (90% of which should be attributed to Polynesians) from the start of operations, allowing the diversification of the economic activity of the atoll, depopulated since the withdrawal of the French army. Some earthworks were carried out in March 2018, but the works, which were to be completed in 2020, are regularly postponed.

On the one hand, many questions are being raised about the environmental impact of the project, which is causing concern among many elected representatives. In addition, on February 25, 2020, the director of the company in charge of the work was given a three-year suspended prison sentence for forgery. In December 2019, Wang Cheng was heard by investigators under the open hearing system as part of a preliminary investigation into suspicions of "abuse of social assets" initiated in January 2019 by the investigation section (SR) of the Papeete gendarmerie.

Tertiary sector and public services
Hao airfield hosts, on average, about 800 flights and between 12 and 15,000 passengers per year, 30% of whom are in transit.

The municipality also hosts a secondary school for the children of the southern Tuamotu and Gambier atolls, as well as, for the past few years, the Center for Education in Appropriate Technologies for Development (CETAD), a vocational training institute specialized in sea-related professions. Most of the teachers come from metropolitan France for a period of two to four years.

Hao acquired a modern desalination plant in 2005. Electricity is permanently supplied by generators (EDT-ELECTRA). In 2006, the municipality was equipped with street lighting powered by two wind turbines and solar panels. Finally, the landing of the Natitua submarine cable and its commissioning in December 2018 allows Hao to be connected to Tahiti and to the global high-speed Internet.

See also
French Polynesia

References

External links

History of Hao Atoll
Classification of the French Polynesian atolls by Salvat (1985)
Atoll list (in French)
Oceandots
Iero
Andía y Varela
Bellingshausen

Communes of French Polynesia
Atolls of the Tuamotus